Joshua Uzoigwe (1 July 1946 – 15 October 2005) was a Nigerian composer and ethnomusicologist. A member of the Igbo ethnic group, many of his works draw on the traditional music of that people.

Early life and education
Uzoigwe was born in Umuahia, Abia State (formerly Imo State), Nigeria.  He began his education at the village primary school in Umuagu.  Most of his early life was spent with his older brother, Sunday Uzoigwe, who was then employed at the University of Ibadan.  For his secondary education, Joshua attended King's College, Lagos before going on to International School Ibadan to study for his Advanced Level Certificate.

From 1970 to 1973, he was at the University of Nigeria, Nsukka, where he began his studies in music. He completed his undergraduate degree (1973–77) at the Guildhall College of Music, London, and from 1977 to 1981 he attended Queen's University Belfast, attaining both an M.A. and a Ph.D. in ethnomusicology.

Career
Uzoigwe lectured in Music at three universities in Nigeria, starting from the Obafemi Awolowo University, Ife, then University of Nigeria Nsukka and finally University of Uyo in Akwa Ibom State. He got very lucky with a breakthrough when he was 21.

Music
Uzoigwe’s best-known compositions include:
"Day is passing"

An accomplished pianist, Joshua accompanied many other musicians in live performances, including Ori Enyi Okoro and Joyce Akinwumi.  He performed many concerts during the Biafran Civil War and was a member of the Odunke Community of Artists, which strove to sustain cultural life during that civil war and to foster Igbo culture in all its dimensions from its base at the University of Nigeria, Nsukka.

Poetry and other publications
Three of Uzoigwe’s poems, "On the fading shadows", "Transition" and "Drying Lake, Rising Spring" taken from Nsukka Harvest: Poetry from Nsukka, 1966–72 (ed. Chukwuma Azuonye, Nsukka: Odunke Publications, 1972, pp. 13–15), appear on http://www.sentinelpoetry.org.uk/magonline1105/Joshua_Uzoigwe.htm

In 1993, he published his study on Akin Euba

Personal life
Joshua Uzoigwe married Joanne McGuckin in Nigeria in 1981.  They had met while he was studying at Queen’s University Belfast.  Joanne was a lecturer at the University of Ibadan, Nigeria, and was completing her postgraduate studies when she died in 1990.  They had three children, Uzoma, Ejike and Nneka.

Joyce Adewumi, founder of the New York African Chorus Ensemble (http://www.nyafricanensemble.com/) and a close friend and former colleague of Uzoigwe’s, writes that her "work at the New York African Chorus Ensemble is dedicated to Joshua and it couldn't have been possible without his influence in my life".

Essays about Joshua Uzoigwe
Sadoh, Godwin. "Creativity and Dance in Joshua Uzoigwe's Music." ComposerUSA 9, No. 2 (2003): 4-5.
_. "Intercultural Creativity in Joshua Uzoigwe's Music." Africa 74, No. 4 (December 2004): 633-661.
_. "The Creative Experience of a Contemporary Nigerian Composer." Living Music 20, No. 1 (Spring 2005): 6-9.
_. "Hybrid Composition: An Introduction to the Age of Atonality in Nigeria." The Diapason 97, No. 11 (November 2006): 22-25.
_. "Twentieth Century Nigerian Composers." NTAMA, 10 January 2007.

References

Sadoh, Godwin (1998). "Joshua Uzoigwe: An Introduction to the Life and Music of a Nigerian Composer."  M.A. thesis.  Pittsburgh, Pennsylvania:  University of Pittsburgh.
Sadoh, Godwin (2007). Joshua Uzoigwe: Memoirs of a Nigerian Composer-Ethnomusicologist. New York: iUniverse Publishing.

External links

https://web.archive.org/web/20040808103033/http://people.africadatabase.org/en/person/16551.html
Article

20th-century classical composers
Musicians from Umuahia
Igbo composers
Nigerian male musicians
Nigerian composers
1946 births
2005 deaths
University of Nigeria alumni
Ethnomusicologists
International School, Ibadan alumni
King's College, Lagos alumni
Alumni of the Guildhall School of Music and Drama
Alumni of Queen's University Belfast
Academic staff of Obafemi Awolowo University
Academic staff of the University of Nigeria
20th-century Nigerian musicians
Male classical composers
Academic staff of the University of Uyo
Igbo academics
People of the Nigerian Civil War
20th-century musicologists
20th-century male musicians